The 2023 ICC Men's T20 World Cup Asia Qualifier is a cricket tournament that forms part of the qualification process for the 2024 ICC Men's T20 World Cup. The first stage of the qualification pathway in the Asia region will consist of two sub-regional qualifiers, both scheduled to be held sometime in 2023. The winner of each of the sub-regional qualifiers will progress to the Asia Regional Final, to be played in 2023, where they will be joined by Nepal, Oman and Bahrain all of whom contested in the 2022 ICC Men's T20 World Cup Global Qualifier A in Oman, Hong Kong and Singapore who contested in the 2022 ICC Men's T20 World Cup Global Qualifier B in Zimbabwe, and the United Arab Emirates who were knocked out of the first round of the 2022 ICC Men's T20 World Cup in Australia. Top two teams in the Asia Regional Final will qualify for the 2024 ICC Men's T20 World Cup.

Teams

References 

ICC
ICC Men's T20 World Cup Qualifier